The adópengő bonds and certificates served as money in the last days before the introduction of the Hungarian forint.

Tax bills
Adópengő (tax-pengő) was introduced on 1 January 1946. The aim was to create a numerical basis for budget calculations, which was independent from the daily changes. The index was created daily by the Institute for Economic Research (then: Magyar Gazdaságkutató Intézet, now: GKI Gazdaságkutató Zrt.) based on retail prices (weights: food and other agricultural products: 50%, industrial products (market price): 30%, and industrial products (fixed price): 20%). The so-called adójegy (tax bill - a bond for adópengő with two months maturity) was introduced in May 1946. First, tax bills were used to pay taxes and to register bank deposits and bank credits. From 23 June it was also used to pay public utility charges and from 8 July it became a legal tender, replacing the pengő, which almost totally lost its value by this time. When the tax-bills became legal tender, the even more serious adópengő inflation replaced the pengő inflation.

The Ludas Matyi satirical magazine explains aptly the relationship between the pengő and the adópengő: "The pengő was the piece of paper that had no value, and the adópengő was used to measure the value of the pengő."

The Tax bills were designed by Endre Horváth.

Savings certificates
The Hungarian Postal Savings Bank issued adópengő non-interest-bearing savings certificates (nem kamatozó pénztárjegy) in June 1946, which also served as legal tender.

References

Economic history of Hungary
1946 in Hungary
1946 in economics